Gustavo Hebling de Aguiar (born 5 April 1996) is a Brazilian professional footballer who plays as a midfielder for Campeonato Brasileiro Série D club Oeste.

References

Living people
1996 births
Association football midfielders
Paris Saint-Germain F.C. players
PEC Zwolle players
Eredivisie players
Brazilian footballers
Brazil youth international footballers
Brazilian expatriate footballers
Expatriate footballers in the Netherlands
Brazilian expatriate sportspeople in the Netherlands
Portimonense S.C. players
Expatriate footballers in Portugal
Primeira Liga players
People from Piracicaba
Footballers from São Paulo (state)